

Jacques-René Hermant (7 May 1855 in Paris, France – 5 June 1930 in France) was a French architect, one of the most renowned architects of fin-de-siècle Paris.  

Born in Paris, the son of the architect Achille Hermant (1823-1903), Hermant was educated at the École des Beaux-Arts under Joseph Auguste Émile Vaudremer.  He was a rationalist architect, but was a strong advocate for the neoromanticism style of the time, preferably the style of Louis XIII. Hermant became an advocate for concrete construction and erected two of the first reinforced concrete buildings in Paris, collaborating with the French engineer Edmond Coignet (1856–1915), who patented his system in 1892. 

Hermant was a professor at the École des Beaux-Arts in Paris and served as chief architect for the city.  He employed the Danish architect Hack Kampmann during Kampmann's stay in Paris in 1883.

Significant buildings 

 the French pavilion for the World's Columbian Exposition, Chicago, 1893
 the French pavilion for the Exposition Internationale, Brussels, 1897
 La Caserne des Célestins, Paris, 1895–1901. Home of the cavalry of the French Republican Guard.
 Le Magasin des Classes Laborieuses, department store, reinforced concrete (with Coignet), Paris, 1899
 La Salle Gaveau, concert hall for the piano firm, reinforced concrete (with Coignet), Paris, 1905
 Société Générale, office building, Blvd. Haussmann, Paris, 1907

Honours 

 Second Grand Prix de Rome, 1880
 Commander Légion d'honneur, 1929

References 

 Balteau, J. (editor), Dictionnaire de biographie française, 1933.
 'Livraisons d'histoire de l'architecture, 2003, Vol. 6, Number 1, p. 47–67.

External links 
 La Salle Gaveau website

19th-century French architects
20th-century French architects
Architects from Paris
1855 births
1930 deaths
Concrete pioneers
Commandeurs of the Légion d'honneur
Prix de Rome for architecture
École des Beaux-Arts alumni